Do Makan (also Romanized as Do Makan and Shah Gharieh; also known as Morādādān and Morādūn) is a village in Khanmirza Rural District of the Central District of Khanmirza County, Chaharmahal and Bakhtiari province, Iran. At the 2006 census, its population was 1,549 in 309 households, when it was in Lordegan County, and before Khanmirza County was established. The following census in 2011 counted 2,730 people in 660 households. The latest census in 2016 showed a population of 2,764 people in 736 households; it was the largest village in its rural district. The village is populated by Lurs.

References 

Khanmirza County

Populated places in Chaharmahal and Bakhtiari Province

Populated places in Khanmirza County

Luri settlements in Chaharmahal and Bakhtiari Province